Pholiota velaglutinosa is a species of agaric fungus in the family Strophariaceae. Found in the western United States, it was described as new to science in 1968 by American mycologists Alexander H. Smith and Lexemuel Ray Hesler. The stipe bears a gelatinous ring.

See also
List of Pholiota species

References

External links

Fungi described in 1968
Fungi of the United States
Strophariaceae
Taxa named by Alexander H. Smith
Fungi without expected TNC conservation status